Manuel Obafemi Akanji (born 19 July 1995) is a Swiss professional footballer who plays as a defender for  club Manchester City and the Switzerland national team.

Club career

Youth football and early career
Born in Neftenbach, Akanji began his youth career with the local club in Wiesendangen. In May 2007, Akanji changed clubs and was a youth-team player for FC Winterthur, featuring for their Under-18 team and later with their second team. In the 2014–15 Challenge League, he became a regular starter for Winterthur having played two games for them during the second half of the 2013–14 season.

Basel
On 15 April 2015, it was announced that Akanji would transfer to Basel for the 2015–16 Super League season. He made his Swiss Super League debut on 26 September 2015 being substituted in against FC Lugano. Under trainer Urs Fischer, Akanji won the Swiss Super League championship at the end of the 2015–16 Super League season and at the end of the 2016–17 Super League season for the second time. For the club this was the eighth title in a row and their 20th championship title in total. They also won the Swiss Cup for the twelfth time, which meant they had won the double for the sixth time in the club's history.

As Swiss Champions, Basel qualified for the 2017–18 UEFA Champions League and started in the Group stage. Akanji played in all six games over the full 90 minutes and helped the team finish in second group position, thus qualifying for the next round. On 15 January 2018, Basel announced that Akanji had transferred to Borussia Dortmund.

Borussia Dortmund
Akanji transferred to Borussia Dortmund on 15 January 2018 during the winter transfer window for a reported fee of 18 million euros. He signed a four and a half year contract dated until June 2022. On 27 September, Akanji scored his first goal for the club and his first Bundesliga goal in a 7–0 victory over 1. FC Nürnberg. Akanji was widely criticised for his costly errors during Dortmund's failed challenge to Bayern during the 2019–20 season. Akanji was one of the main players singled out as a weak link in the team.

Manchester City
On 1 September 2022, Akanji joined Premier League champions Manchester City, signing a contract until 2027 for a reported fee of £15 million. He made his debut for City five days later, starting in a 4–0 away win over Sevilla in the UEFA Champions League group stage. He made his Premier League debut on 17 September, starting in a 3–0 away win over Wolverhampton Wanderers. He was voted the Etihad player of the month for October.

International career
Akanji made two appearances for the Switzerland U-20 national team. His debut was on 7 September 2014 in the 0–0 draw against the German U-20 national team. From 2014, he was a member of the Switzerland U-21 team and made his debut for them on 26 March in the 0–3 defeat by the Italian U-21 team. Akanji made his debut in the senior team in the 2–0 win against Faroe Islands in the 2018 World Cup qualification match on 9 June 2017. He played the entire 90 minutes. He was included in the Swiss team's 23 man squad for the 2018 World Cup in Russia.

In May 2019, Akanji played in 2019 UEFA Nations League Finals, where his team finished fourth. In 2021, he was called up to the national team for UEFA Euro 2020. 

Akanji scored his first senior international goal against Spain in a 2–1 UEFA Nations League victory on 24 September 2022.

Akanji scored the only goal for the Switzerland national team in a 6–1 loss to Portugal in the FIFA World Cup 2022 on 7 December 2022.

Personal life
Akanji was born in Neftenbach, Switzerland to a Swiss mother and a Nigerian father. He has two sisters, one of which (Sarah) is a football player and politician for the Social Democrats.

In 2017, already a professional player, he completed his vocational training as a tradesman (″Kaufmann″). In Swiss TV in 2018 he showed excellent skills at mental calculation.

Career statistics

Club

International

Scores and results list Switzerland's goal tally first, score column indicates score after each Akanji goal.

Honours
FC Basel
 Swiss Super League: 2015–16, 2016–17
 Swiss Cup: 2016–17

Borussia Dortmund
 DFB-Pokal: 2020–21
 DFL-Supercup: 2019

References

External links

1995 births
Living people
People from Winterthur District
Sportspeople from the canton of Zürich
Swiss men's footballers
Association football defenders
FC Winterthur players
FC Basel players
Borussia Dortmund players
Manchester City F.C. players
Expatriate footballers in England
Swiss expatriate sportspeople in England
Swiss expatriate sportspeople in Germany
Swiss Challenge League players
Swiss Super League players
Bundesliga players
Switzerland youth international footballers
Switzerland under-21 international footballers
Switzerland international footballers
2018 FIFA World Cup players
UEFA Euro 2020 players
2022 FIFA World Cup players
Swiss expatriate footballers
Expatriate footballers in Germany

Swiss people of Nigerian descent
Sportspeople of Nigerian descent